The Factory was an Australian television program that was broadcast on ABC TV on Saturday mornings, from 1987 to 1989. The Factory was hosted by Andrew Daddo and Alex Papps.

Created to fill the void left by the demise of the iconic music show Countdown, The Factory featured music videos, studio performances, and interviews but also extended the format to include comedy sketches and magazine segments covering topics such as fashion, movies and other pop culture. Reporters included Tania Lacy and Karen Leng.

See also

 List of Australian music television shows
 List of Australian television series
 List of Australian music television shows
 List of programs broadcast by ABC Television

References

External links
 

Australian music television series
Australian Broadcasting Corporation original programming
1987 Australian television series debuts
1989 Australian television series endings